Kassoum is a department or commune of Sourou Province in north-western Burkina Faso. Its capital lies at the town of Kassoum.

References

Departments of Burkina Faso
Sourou Province